Ingemar Nilsson (born 1956) is a Swedish politician and former member of the Riksdag, the national legislature. A member of the Social Democratic Party, he represented Västernorrland County between October 2010 and August 2021.

Nilsson studied insurance for three years. He worked in a sawmill between 1972 and 1983 and for the Swedish Wood Industry Workers' Union between 1983 and 1987. He held various positions at Folksam between 1987 and 1999.

References

1956 births
Living people
Members of the Riksdag 2010–2014
Members of the Riksdag 2014–2018
Members of the Riksdag 2018–2022
Members of the Riksdag from the Social Democrats
Swedish trade unionists